There are several lakes named Mud Lake in the U.S. state of Utah.

Mud Lake (1)
Mud Lake is a lake located in Beaver County, Utah, situated on Birch Creek Mountain.  The lake is within the Fishlake National Forest.

Mud Lake (2) 
Mud Lake is a lake located in Beaver County, Utah.  The lake is within the Fishlake National Forest.

Mud Lake (3) 
Mud Lake is a lake located in Beaver County, Utah, situated on the Tushar Mountains, between Shelly Baldy and Delano Peaks.

Mud Lake (4)
Mud Lake is a lake located southeast of Beryl, Utah in Escalante Township of Iron County, Utah.

Mud Lake (5) 
Mud Lake is a lake located in Duchesne County, Utah.  The lake in within the Ashley National Forest

Mud Lake (6)
Mud Lake is a lake located in Garfield County, Utah, situation on the Griffin Top of the Escalante Mountains.  The lake is within the Dixie National Forest.

Mud Lake (7)
Mud Lake is a lake located in Garfield County, Utah, situation on the west slope of the Escalante Mountains, facing Johns Valley.  The lake is within the Dixie National Forest.

Mud Lake (8)
Mud Lake is a lake located in Garfield County, Utah, situation on the west slope of the Escalante Mountains, facing Johns Valley.  The lake is within the Dixie National Forest.

Mud Lake (9)
Mud Lake is a lake located in Grand County, Utah.  The lake is within the Manti-La Sal National Forest.

Mud Lake (10)
Mud Lake is a lake located on Parker Mountain in southeastern Piute County, Utah.  The lake is within the Fishlake National Forest.

Mud Lake (11)
Mud Lake is a lake located on the Sevier Plateau in Sevier County, Utah.  The lake is within the Fishlake National Forest.

Mud Lake (12)
Mud Lake is a lake located in southern Wayne County, Utah.

References
 USGS—U.S. Board on Geographic Names

Lakes of Utah